The 2003 elections for  Guildford Borough Council were the first, and as of 2011 the only, full election for Guildford Borough Council conducted by an all postal ballot. The result saw the Conservatives win a majority of seats on Guildford Borough Council for the first time since losing their majority in the 1991 election.

Boundary changes

In September 1998, the Local Government Commission for England published their "Final Recommendations on the Future Electoral Arrangements for Guildford in Surrey".  The recommendations in this report formed the basis for the redrawing of ward boundaries in Guildford increasing the number of wards from 21 to 22; and increasing the number of councillors from 45 to 48.  The 2003 council election was the first contested under these new ward boundaries.

The new ward boundaries differed from the old ones as follows:
 13 of the 21 wards in Guildford saw their boundaries alter to some degree or other;
 8 wards were left unaltered namely - Clandon & Horsley, Effingham, Lovelace, Normandy, Pirbright, Send, Tillingbourne and Worplesdon;
 Merrow & Burpham ward, which previously had elected 3 councillors, was split in two.  In its place was created a new Merrow ward with 3 councillors and a new Burpham ward with 2 councillors.
 the three wards representing Ash and Tongham, prior to the 2003 boundary changes,  had been named Ash, Ash Vale and Tongham. Between them they had been represented by 6 councillors.  They were replaced by three substantially redrawn wards with the names Ash South & Tongham, Ash Vale and Ash Wharf, which between them had 7 councillors.  The new Ash Vale ward covered a significantly smaller geographical area than the previous ward known as Ash Vale;
 the boundary line between the Pilgrims ward and the Shalford ward was altered so that the Shalford ward would now include the areas of Artington and Compton which had previously been part of Pilgrims.  This change saw the number of councillors representing Shalford increase from 1 to 2 and the number of councillors representing Pilgrims decline from 2 to 1;
 the dividing line between the Stoughton ward and the Westborough ward was redrawn;
 the various dividing lines between the following wards in Guildford town were redrawn: Christchurch, Friary & St Nicolas, Holy Trinity, Onslow, and Stoke; and
 the number of councillors representing Holy Trinity increased from 2 to 3 and the number of councillors representing Stoke decreased from 3 to 2.

Voter Turnout

Average voter turnout increased throughout Guildford Borough Council from 36.2%, in 1999, to 53.4%, in 2003.

Summary of election results

Going into the 2003 election the net position was as follows.  (The net position includes the defection of one of the Liberal Democrat councillors for Worplesdon first to the independents, in 1999, and then, in 2002, to the Conservatives).

After the election the position was as follows.

 The Conservatives made a net gain of eight seats, gaining nine and losing one;
  The Liberal Democrats retained the same number of seats; gaining four and losing four;
  The Labour Party lost four seats;
  The number of independents on Guildford Borough Council reduced from two to one.

Conservative seat changes
In the May 2003 elections, the Conservatives gained 6 seats in Guildford town itself (4 in the Merrow and Burpham area, 1 in Holy Trinity Ward and 1 in Onslow ward); 2 seats in the Ash and Tongham area, towards the west of the borough of Guildford; and 1 seat in Tillingbourne, the rural district towards the south east of Guildford borough.

The Liberal Democrats retook from the Conservatives the 1 Worplesdon seat which the Liberal Democrats had lost as a result of a defection during the 1999-2003 session.

Liberal Democrat seat changes
In May 2003, the Liberal Democrats gained 3 seats from the Labour Party in Westborough ward, towards the west of Guildford town.  The Liberal Democrats retook from the Conservatives the Worplesdon seat which the Liberal Democrats had lost as a result of a defection during the 1999-2003 session.

The Liberal Democrats lost 4 seats to the Conservatives three in Guildford town itself (2 losses in the Merrow & Burpham areas and 1 in Onslow ward) and one in the rural Tillingbourne ward.

Labour seat changes
The Labour Party lost 3 seats to the Liberal Democrats in Westborough.  Additionally the Labour Party lost 1 seat in Stoke ward, towards the north of Guildford town as a result of boundary changes and a reduction in the number of councillors representing that ward from 3 to 2.

By election changes
Subsequent to the May 2003 elections, the Liberal Democrats gained a seat from the Conservatives in Merrow ward, in a by election in July 2003, increasing the number of Liberal Democrat seats on the council from 19 to 20 and reducing the number of Conservative seats from 26 to 25.

May 2003 Results

References

2003
2003 English local elections
2000s in Surrey